SDM Mangala Jyothi Integrated School (MJIS), Vamanjoor, is an Integrated School and Society for the Welfare of the Disabled has provided educational activities for disabled children with normal children with the concept of Integrated Education since 1981. Founded by the late Mohini Appaji Nayak, this institution is now operated by the Shri Dharmasthala Manjunatheshwara Educational Society,  of Ujire. Poojya Dr. D. Veerendra Heggade is the President of the Institution. An Industrial Training Centre also will run with the concept of Inclusive Education; disabled Students will be given industrial training with normal students.

History
SDM Mangalajyothi Integrated School was started in 1981 to fulfill the aspirations of disabled children by “The Society For The Welfare Of The Disabled”, at Vamanjoor, Mangalore, with the great efforts of the late Mrs. Mohini A. Naik.

Strategy
The concept of Integrated Education is ‘Providing education to disabled children along with normal children in a common roof’. In this institution, education is provided for special groups such as the orthopedically challenged, hearing impaired, visually impaired, autistic, and those with learning disabilities, along with children of economically or socially disadvantaged parents in a ratio of 1:2.

Links

Schools in Dakshina Kannada district
Educational institutions established in 1981
1981 establishments in Karnataka